Othman Benjelloun (Tamazight: ⵄⴻⵜⵎⴰⵏ ⴱⴰⵏⵊⴰⵍⵍⵓⵏ; ; born 1931) is a Moroccan banker billionaire businessman. He is known for co-founding of BMCE Bank and Bank of Africa, and serves as its chairman, chief executive officer. In February 2022, his net worth was estimated by Forbes at US$1.6 billion.

Career
Benjelloun's father was a large shareholder in an insurance company that Benjelloun later took over in 1988. He turned this into RMA Watanya. After purchasing the insurance company, Benjelloun expanded the business venture into the banking industry. His banking enterprise, the BMCE Bank has its presence felt in at least 12 countries in Africa after it purchased the Mali-based Bank of Africa. The banking aspect of Benjelloun's business career is worth $4 billion based solely on its market capitalization profits.

Benjelloun received an education in engineering at the École Polytechnique Fédérale de Lausanne in Switzerland. During the 1960s and 1970s, he made strategic alliances with global automobile manufacturers Volvo and General Motors. He is also the chairman of Meditelecom along with being associated with Telefónica and Portugal Telecom. He is a member of the World Union of Arab Bankers.

Personal life
He is a member of the prominent Benjelloun family from Fez, Morocco.

He is married to Leila Mezian, daughter of the Moroccan General Mohamed Meziane. He has two children.

Awards 
2022 Best African Personality

See also
 Economy of Morocco

References

Bibliography
 "Les 50 personnalités qui font le Maroc : Othman Benjelloun. 79 ans, PDG de BMCE et de FinanceCom", Jeune Afrique, pp. 2545–2546, 18–31 October 2009, p. 40

1931 births
20th-century Moroccan businesspeople
Living people
People from Fez, Morocco
Moroccan bankers
École Polytechnique Fédérale de Lausanne alumni
Moroccan chief executives
Moroccan engineers
Moroccan billionaires
Fellows of King's College London